The 2013 African Handball Champions League was the 35th edition, organized by the African Handball Confederation, under the auspices of the International Handball Federation, the handball sport governing body. The tournament was held from October 3–12 in Marrakech, Morocco, contested by 11 teams and won by Espérance Sportive de Tunis of Tunisia.

Espérance de Tunis qualified for the 2014 IHF Super Globe.

Draw

Preliminary round 

Times given below are in WET UTC+0.

Group A

* Note:  Advance to quarter-finals Relegated to 9-11th classification

Group B

* Note:  Advance to quarter-finals Relegated to 9-11th classification

Knockout stage

Bracket

5-8th bracket

9-11th bracket

Final ranking

* Note:  Qualified to the 2014 IHF Super Globe

Awards

See also
 2014 African Handball Championship

References

External links
 Official website

African Handball Champions League
African Handball Champions League
African Handball Champions League
2013 Africa Women's Handball Championship for Clubs Champions
International handball competitions hosted by Morocco